Langlade County is a county located in the U.S. state of Wisconsin. As of the 2020 census,  the population was 19,491. Its county seat is Antigo.

History
Langlade County was created on March 3, 1879, as New County. It was renamed Langlade County, in honor of Charles de Langlade, on February 20, 1880, and fully organized on February 19, 1881. The county's original borders extended northward from the top of Shawano County up to the Michigan state line. Between 1881 and 1885, the borders of Langlade County changed as nearby Lincoln and Shawano counties added or gave up area. Langlade lost its northernmost area along the Michigan border to Forest County when it was created in 1885.

Geography
The highest point in the county is at the foot of the Basswood Lookout Tower west of Summit Lake (elev:1857')

Adjacent counties
 Oneida County - northwest
 Forest County - northeast
 Oconto County - east
 Menominee County - southeast
 Shawano County - south
 Marathon County - southwest
 Lincoln County - west

National protected area
 Nicolet National Forest (part)

Demographics

2020 census
As of the census of 2020, the population was 19,491. The racial makeup of the county was 93.0% White, 1.3% Native American, 0.5% Black or African American, 0.4% Asian, 0.7% from other races, and 4.1% from two or more races. Ethnically, the population was 2.4% Hispanic or Latino of any race.

2000 census

As of the census of 2000, there were 20,740 people, 8,452 households, and 5,814 families residing in the county.  The population density was 24 people per square mile (9/km2). There were 11,187 housing units at an average density of 13 per square mile (5/km2). The racial makeup of the county was 97.93% White, 0.15% Black or African American, 0.54% Native American, 0.27% Asian, 0.02% Pacific Islander, 0.20% from other races, and 0.87% from two or more races. 0.82% of the population were Hispanic or Latino of any race. 49.4% were of German, 8.6% Polish, 6.2% Irish and 5.8% American ancestry.

There were 8,452 households, out of which 29.40% had children under the age of 18 living with them, 56.70% were married couples living together, 8.20% had a female householder with no husband present, and 31.20% were non-families. 26.70% of all households were made up of individuals, and 13.60% had someone living alone who was 65 years of age or older. The average household size was 2.42 and the average family size was 2.93.

In the county, the population was spread out, with 24.40% under the age of 18, 6.50% from 18 to 24, 26.00% from 25 to 44, 24.30% from 45 to 64, and 18.80% who were 65 years of age or older. The median age was 40 years. For every 100 females there were 98.50 males. For every 100 females age 18 and over, there were 95.60 males.

In 2017, there were 196 births, giving a general fertility rate of 68.3 births per 1000 women aged 15–44, the 20th highest rate out of all 72 Wisconsin counties. Additionally, there were 6 reported induced abortions performed on women of Langlade County residence in 2017.

Transportation

Major highways
  U.S. Highway 45
  Highway 17 (Wisconsin)
  Highway 47 (Wisconsin)
  Highway 52 (Wisconsin)
  Highway 55 (Wisconsin)
  Highway 64 (Wisconsin)

Buses
List of intercity bus stops in Wisconsin

Airport
 KAIG - Langlade County Airport
The county owns and operates the Langlade County Airport which serves both the local and transient general aviation community.

Communities

City
 Antigo (county seat)

Village
 White Lake

Towns

 Ackley
 Ainsworth
 Antigo
 Elcho
 Evergreen
 Langlade
 Neva
 Norwood
 Parrish
 Peck
 Polar
 Price
 Rolling
 Summit
 Upham
 Vilas
 Wolf River

Census-designated places
 Elcho
 Post Lake
 Summit Lake

Unincorporated communities

 Bavaria
 Bryant
 Choate
 Deerbrook
 Elmhurst
 Elton
 Four Corners
 Freeman
 Hollister
 Kempster
 Koepenick
 Langlade
 Lily
 Markton
 Neva
 Neva Corners
 Ormsby
 Parrish
 Pearson
 Phlox
 Pickerel
 Polar
 Sherry Junction

Ghost towns/neighborhoods
 Kent/Drexel
 Van Ostrand

Politics

See also
 National Register of Historic Places listings in Langlade County, Wisconsin

References

Further reading
 Commemorative Biographical Record of the Upper Wisconsin Counties of Waupaca, Portage, Wood, Marathon, Lincoln, Oneida, Vilas, Langlade and Shawano. Chicago: J. H. Beers, 1895.
 Dessureau, Robert M. History of Langlade County, Wisconsin. Antigo, Wis.: Berner Bros., 1922.

External links
 Langlade County government website
 Langlade County map from the Wisconsin Department of Transportation
 Langlade County Historical Society

 
1881 establishments in Wisconsin
Populated places established in 1881